Echelon may refer to:

 A level formation
 A level or rank in an organization, profession, or society
 Echelon formation, a step-like arrangement of units
 ECHELON, a worldwide electronic intelligence-gathering operation, within the UKUSA Agreement, mainly for industry espionage

Places
 Echelon, New Jersey

Sciences
 En echelon veins, geological feature
 Row echelon form, in mathematics, a kind of matrix

Arts
 Echelon (band), a four-piece band hailing from Essex, England
 The Echelon, fanbase of the band Thirty Seconds to Mars, named after a song on their debut album.
Echelons (album)

Computer and video games
 Echelon (video game), 2001 flight simulator game published by Buka Entertainment
 Echelon, 1998 strategy game, published by Midas Interactive Entertainment BV
 Echelon (1987 video game), 1987 space flight simulator game, published and developed by Access Software, Inc
 Echelon (warez), a game console warez organization

Businesses
 Echelon Place, a former project by Boyd Gaming resort, unfinished site sold to Resorts World
 Echelon Mall, old name of Voorhees Town Center 
 Echelon Corporation, a United States corporation, self-identified as a pioneer in control networks, creators of the LonWorks distributed control platform
 Echelon Management & Co, Music artist management company

Other uses
 Echelon parking, a way of arranging parked cars

See also